Scopula homaema is a moth of the  family Geometridae. It is found on the Solomon Islands.

References

Moths described in 1920
homaema
Moths of Oceania